The 2021–22 season is Newcastle Jets' 14th season since its establishment in 2008. The club is participating in the A-League Women (formerly the W-League).

Squad

Transfers

Transfers in

Transfers out

A-League Women

League table

Results summary

Results by matchday

Matches

 All times are in AEDT

Club awards

Newcastle Jets Player of the Month award

''Awarded monthly to the player that was chosen by supporters voting online.

See also 
 2021–22 Newcastle Jets FC season

External links

References

Newcastle Jets FC (A-League Women) seasons